A list of people, who died during the 12th century, who have received recognition as Blessed (through beatification) or Saint (through canonization) from the Catholic Church:

See also 

Christianity in the 12th century

12
12
12th-century Christians
Lists of 12th-century people